is a railway station in the town of Higashiura, Chita District, Aichi Prefecture, Japan, operated by Central Japan Railway Company (JR Tōkai). It is also a freight terminal for the Kinuura Rinkai Railway.

Lines
Higashiura Station is served by the Taketoyo Line, and is located 6.8 kilometers from the starting point of the line at Ōbu Station.

Station layout
The station has two opposed side platforms connected by a footbridge. The station has automated ticket machines, TOICA automated turnstiles and is unattended.

Platforms

Adjacent stations

|-
!colspan=5|Central Japan Railway Company

Station history
Higashiura Station was opened on November 11, 1944 as a passenger station on the Japanese Government Railways (JGR), which became the Japanese National Railways (JNR) after World War II. Small parcel services began in 1947, and freight services in 1948. Freight services were discontinued in January 1960; however, the Kinuura Rinkai Railway opened the Hekinan Line on May 25, 1977, which restored freight service to the station.  With the privatization and dissolution of the JNR on April 1, 1987, the station came under the control of JR Central. Automatic turnstiles were installed in May 1992, and the TOICA system of magnetic fare cards was implemented in November 2006.

Station numbering was introduced to the Taketoyo Line in March 2018; Higashiura Station was assigned station number CE04.

Passenger statistics
In fiscal 2017, the station was used by an average of 1880 passengers daily (boarding passengers only).

Surrounding area
Kinuura Port
Japan National Route 366

See also
 List of Railway Stations in Japan

References

External links

Railway stations in Japan opened in 1944
Railway stations in Aichi Prefecture
Taketoyo Line
Stations of Central Japan Railway Company
Higashiura, Aichi